Herbert Stephen Henderson VC (30 March 1870 – 10 August 1942) was a Scottish-born Rhodesian recipient of the Victoria Cross, the highest British and Commonwealth award. Henderson was born in Glasgow and educated at Kelvinside Academy in Glasgow.

Details
Henderson was 26 years old, and a trooper in the Rhodesia Horse, Bulawayo Field Force during the Matabeleland Rebellion, when the following deed took place for which he was awarded the VC.

On 30 March 1896 at Campbell's Store, near Bulawayo, Rhodesia (now Zimbabwe), a patrol which had been sent to the rescue of another beleaguered patrol, was surprised by rebels and Trooper Henderson and another trooper were cut off from the main party. The second trooper was shot through the knee and his horse killed, so Trooper Henderson put the wounded man on his own horse, and, walking beside it, made his way to Bulawayo, 35 miles away. They had to move principally by night, as the country was full of marauding rebels and they had no food for two days and one night.

He was involved in the mining industry. He was prevented from serving in World War I as he was working in a reserved occupation.

Medal
His VC is on display at the National Army Museum in Chelsea, London.

References

 Account of the action
 Profile
Monuments to Courage (David Harvey, 1999)
The Register of the Victoria Cross (This England, 1997)
Scotland's Forgotten Valour (Graham Ross, 1995)

British recipients of the Victoria Cross
Rhodesian recipients of the Victoria Cross
1870 births
1942 deaths
Second Matabele War recipients of the Victoria Cross
British colonial army soldiers
Military personnel from Glasgow
People educated at Kelvinside Academy
Deaths from ulcers